Corpus Christi FC is an American soccer club based in Corpus Christi, Texas, that competes in the Mid South Division of the USL League Two. The club was founded in 2017. The team plays its home games at the St. John Paul II High School Football Stadium. Team colors are blue and white.

History
Corpus Christi was awarded an expansion franchise by the Premier Development League in October 2017. The team began playing in the 2018 PDL season.

Players and staff
As of May 26, 2022.

Players

Staff
As of February 3, 2022.
 Sammy Giraldo – Advisor
 Ignacio Dicun – Head Coach
 Manuel Iwabuchi – Associate Head Coach
 Patrick Kasperitis – Assistant/Goalkeeper Coach
 Borja Barcenilla – Assistant Coach
 Emmanuel Orupabo – Assistant Coach
 Danielle Rees - Athletic Trainer

Record
As of July 16, 2021.

References

USL League Two teams
Soccer clubs in Texas
Association football clubs established in 2017
2017 establishments in Texas